Luisant is a commune in the Eure-et-Loir department in northern France.

Population

Twin towns
Luisant is twinned with:

  Hochstadt, Germany, since 1974
  Villanueva del Pardillo, Spain, since 2002
  Chions, Italy, since 2002

See also
Communes of the Eure-et-Loir department

References

External links

Official site

Communes of Eure-et-Loir